Dave McCalla (born 23 May 1973) is a British bobsledder. He competed in the four man event at the 2002 Winter Olympics.

References

External links
 

1973 births
Living people
British male bobsledders
Olympic bobsledders of Great Britain
Bobsledders at the 2002 Winter Olympics
Sportspeople from Coventry